This article contains information about the literary events and publications of 1691.

Events
March 17 – The Athenian Mercury begins twice-weekly publication in London.
May 5 – Bernard Le Bovier de Fontenelle becomes a member of the Académie française.

New books

Prose
Adrien Baillet – La vie de monsieur Descartes
Barbara Blaugdone – An Account of the Travels, Sufferings & Persecutions of Barbara Blaugdone. Given forth as a testimony to the Lord's power, and for the encouragement of Friends
Gerard Langbaine – An Account of the English Dramatic Poets
Maximilien Misson – Nouveau voyage d'Italie
Sir Dudley North – Discourses upon Trade
The Kingdom of Ireland
Sor Juana Inés de la Cruz – Respuesta a Sor Filotea de la Cruz

Drama
Anonymous – The Braggadocio, or Bawd Turn'd Puritan
John Bancroft – Edward III, with the Fall of Mortimer, Earl of March
Pedro Calderon de la Barca – Céfalo y Pocris
David-Augustin de Brueys & Jean Palaprat – Le Muet
John Dryden – King Arthur, or the British Worthy (a "semi-opera" with music by Henry Purcell)
Thomas d'Urfey – Love for Money
Joseph Harris – The Mistakes
William Mountfort – Greenwich Park
Archibald Pitcairne and others – The Phanaticks (first published as The Assembly, or Scotch Reformation, posthumously as "by a Scots Gentleman", 1722)
Jean Racine – Athalie
John Smith (probable author – issued anonymously) – Win Her and Take Her, or Old Fools will be Medling: a comedy
Thomas Southerne – The Wives Excuse
John Wilson – Belphegor, or the Marriage of the Devil published

Births
February 3 – George Lillo, English dramatist and actor (died 1739)
February 27 – Edward Cave, English printer and publisher (died 1754)
April 9 – Johann Matthias Gesner, German classicist (died 1761)
October 18 – John Leland, English theologian (died 1766)

Deaths
June 26 – John Flavel, English Presbyterian religious writer (born 1627)
July 30 – Daniel Georg Morhof, German writer and critic (born 1639)
October 8 – Thomas Barlow, English religious writer and bishop (born 1609)
October 10 – Isaac de Benserade, French poet (born 1613)
December 8 – Richard Baxter, English Puritan religious leader and writer (born 1615)
Probable year of death – Samuel Pordage, English poet and cleric (born 1633)

References

 
Years of the 17th century in literature